The following is an overview of 2013 in manga. It includes winners of notable awards, best-sellers, title debuts and endings, deaths of notable manga-related people as well as any other relevant manga-related events. For an overview of the year in comics from other countries, see 2013 in comics.

Awards
37th Kodansha Manga Awards
Best Children's Manga: Animal Land by Makoto Raiku
Best Shōnen Manga: Your Lie in April by Naoshi Arakawa
Best Shōjo Manga: Ore Monogatari!!, written by Kazune Kawahara and illustrated by Aruko
Best General Manga: Gurazeni, written by Yūji Moritaka and illustrated by Keiji Adachi and Prison School by Akira Hiramoto
6th Manga Taishō: Umimachi Diary by Akimi Yoshida
44th Seiun Awards
Best Comic: Inherit the Stars by Yukinobu Hoshino
58th Shogakukan Manga Awards
Best Children's Manga: Mysterious Joker by Hideyasu Takahashi
Best Shōnen Manga: Silver Spoon by Hiromu Arakawa
Best Shōjo Manga: Piece – Kanojo no Kioku by Hinako Ashihara
Best General Manga: I Am a Hero by Kengo Hanazawa
17th Tezuka Osamu Cultural Prize
Grand Prize: Kingdom by Yasuhisa Hara
New Creator Prize: Sunny Sunny Ann! by Miki Yamamoto
Short Work Prize: Kikai-jikake no Ai by Yoshiie Gōda

Best-sellers

Titles
The following is a list of the 10 best-selling manga titles in Japan during 2014 according to Oricon.

Volumes
The following is a list of the 10 best-selling manga volumes in Japan during 2014 according to Oricon.

Title debuts
January - Aikatsu!, written by Shiori Kanaki and illustrated by Akane
January - Aoharu x Machinegun by NAOE
January - The Asterisk War, written by Yuu Miyazaki and illustrated by Ningen
February 12 - Toaru Majutsu no Index: Endymion no Kiseki, written by Kazuma Kamachi and illustrated by Ryōsuke Asakura
February 15 - Kōdai-ke no Hitobito by 
April 27 - Absolute Duo, written by Takumi Hiiragiboshi and illustrated by 	Shin'ichirō Nariie
April - Dame na Watashi ni Koishite Kudasai by Aya Nakahara
April - Seisen Cerberus: Mō Hitori no Eiyū, written and illustrated by Seijirō Narumi
May - Complex Age by Yui Sakuma
May - Bamboo Blade C, written by Masahiro Totsuka and illustrated by Jingu Takao
June 13 - A-bout!! - Asagiri Daikatsuyaku Hen by Ichikawa Masa
August 26 - Attack on Titan: Before the Fall, written by Ryō Suzukaze and illustrated by Satoshi Shiki
August 30 - Ashizuri Suizokukan by Panpanya
August - The Comic Artist and His Assistants 2 by Hiroyuki
September 28 - No Regrets, written by Gun Snark and illustrated by Hikaru Suruga
September - Mini Vanguard by Quily
October 12 - Handa-kun by Satsuki Yoshino
October 25 - Akame ga Kill! Zero, written by Takahiro and illustrated by Kei Toru
October - BB Deformer, written by Masahiro Totsuka and illustrated by Saki Azumi
October - Battle Spirits: Saikyou Ginga Ultimate Zero, written by Hajime Yatate and illustrated by Masato Ichishiki
October - Salaryman Exorcist: The Sorrows of Yukio Okumura, written by Kazue Kato and illustrated by Minoru Sasaki
November 6 - Bartender à Tokyo, written by Araki Joh and illustrated by Osamu Kajisa
November 9 - 12 Beast by Okayado
November 9 - Bayonetta: Bloody Fate by Mizuki Sakakibara
December 27 - Abyss of Hyperspace, written by Tatsuo Sato and illustrated by Chibimaru
December 27 - A Certain Scientific Accelerator, written by Kazuma Kamachi and illustrated by Arata Yamaji
December - 37.5°C no Namida by 
December - Angel Beats! The 4-koma: Osora no Shinda Sekai kara, written by Jun Maeda and illustrated by Haruka Komowata
December - Sungeki no Kyojin by 
December - Captain Tsubasa: Rising Sun by Yōichi Takahashi
The Ancient Magus' Bride by Kore Yamazaki
Clockwork Planet, written by Yuu Kamiya and Tsubaki Himana and illustrated by Kuro

Title endings
April - Seisen Cerberus: Mō Hitori no Eiyū, written and illustrated by Seijirō Narumi
May - A-bout! by Ichikawa Masa
October 12 - Toaru Majutsu no Index: Endymion no Kiseki, written by Kazuma Kamachi and illustrated by Ryōsuke Asakura
December 9 - Bayonetta: Bloody Fate by Mizuki Sakakibara
December 13 - Oboreru Knife by George Asakura
Bartender à Paris, written by Araki Joh and illustrated by Osamu Kajisa

Deaths
February 6 - , manga artist
April 4 - Noboru Yamaguchi, light novel author
August - Jun Sadogawa, manga artist
October 13 - Takashi Yanase, manga artist
October 22 - Yanwari Kazama, manga artist
November 3 - , manga artist
, manga artist

See also
2013 in anime

References

Manga
Manga